Pat Patterson (born 13 November 1946) is a former  Australian rules footballer who played with Geelong in the Victorian Football League (VFL).

Notes

External links 

Living people
1946 births
Australian rules footballers from Victoria (Australia)
Geelong Football Club players
University Blacks Football Club players